Leopold Henri Haimson (1927 – December 18, 2010) was a historian and professor at Columbia University.

Haimson received his PhD from Harvard University in history and social relations in 1952. He was a member of faculty at the University of Chicago from 1956. He joined the faculty at Columbia in 1965 as a professor of Russian history and a member of the Russian Institute. He was the Director of the Interuniversity Project on the History of Menshevik Movement and a Fellow at the Center for Advanced Study in the Behavioral Sciences at Stanford University. He published many books and articles, specializing in the history of Russia, particularly the Mensheviks movement.

Publications
The Russian Marxists and the Origins of Bolshevism (Cambridge, MA: Harvard University Press, 1955).
The Parties and the State: The Evolution of Political Attitudes (Bobbs-Merrill, 1960)
 The making of a workers' revolution: Russian social democracy, 1891–1903 (University of Chicago Press, 1967) with Allan K. Wildman 
 The Mensheviks: From the Revolution of 1917 to the Second World War (University of Chicago Press, 1974) with David Dallin
The Mensheviks : From the Revolution of 1917 to the Second World War (1975)  with G. Vakar
The Politics of Rural Russia, 1905–1914 (1979)
The Making of Three Russian Revolutionaries: Voices from the Menshevik Past (1987) with Ziva Galili Y Garcia & Richard Wortman 
 Russia's Revolutionary Experience, 1905-1917: Two Essays (Columbia University Press, 2005)
 "The Problem of Social Stability in Urban Russia, 1905-1917 (Part One)" Slavic Review (1964) 23#4 pp 619–642 in JSTOR; "The Problem of Social Stability in Urban Russia, 1905-1917 (Part Two)." Slavic Review 24.1 (1965): 1-22. in JSTOR
 "'The Problem of Political and Social Stability in Urban Russia on the Eve of War and Revolution' Revisited." Slavic Review (2000) pp: 848-875. in JSTOR
 with Charles Tilly. "Strikes, wars, and revolutions in an international perspective." in Tilly, ed., Strike Waves in The Late Nineteenth and Early Twentieth Centuries (1989).
Strikes, Social Conflict, and the First World War: An International Perspective
 "Lenin's Revolutionary Career Revisited: Some Observations on Recent Discussions." Kritika: Explorations in Russian and Eurasian History 5.1 (2004): 55-80.

References
An interview with Leopold Haimson
Daly, Jonathan, “The Pleiade: Five Scholars Who Founded Russian Historical Studies in America,” Kritika: Explorations in Russian and Eurasian History 18, no. 4 (Fall 2017): 785–826.

American historians
Columbia University faculty
Historians of Russia
Date of birth unknown
2010 deaths
1927 births
Harvard Graduate School of Arts and Sciences alumni
Center for Advanced Study in the Behavioral Sciences fellows